The Hong Kong men's national squash team represents Hong Kong in international squash team competitions, and is governed by Hong Kong Squash.

Since 1979, Hong Kong has participated in one quarter final of the World Squash Team Open, in 2003.

Current team
 Leung Chi Hin Henry
 Lau Tsz Kwan Alex
 Wong Chi Him
 Tang Ming Hong
 Lam Yat Ting, Harley

Former Team Members
 Dick Lau
 Leo Au
 Lee Ho Yin Max
 Yip Tsz Fung
 Kwong Yu Shun Anson
 Chris Lo
 Wong Wai Hang
 Faheem Khan
 Tony Choi

Results

World Team Squash Championships

Asian Squash Team Championships

See also 
 Hong Kong Squash
 World Team Squash Championships
 Hong Kong women's national squash team

References 

Squash teams
Men's national squash teams
Squash
Squash
Men's sport in Hong Kong